Melongena melongena, common name the Caribbean crown conch, is a species of large sea snail, a marine gastropod mollusk in the family Melongenidae, the crown conches.

References

Melongenidae
Gastropods described in 1758
Taxa named by Carl Linnaeus